Banana Slug News is a broadcast news program at the University of California, Santa Cruz. As a subset of Student Media at UCSC, the news group broadcasts live on UCSC's on-campus television station, SCTV Channel 16 (formerly 28).

BSN was created in December 2004 by a group of Film and Digital Media students seeking production opportunities otherwise not provided by the University.  BSN became a community studies class in Fall 2005 (2 units of course credit were originally awarded in Spring 2005) as a way to receive course credit for time and energy put into the laborious broadcast.  As of Winter 2010, BSN ceased receiving its university funding and became an independent, student-run journalism program.

Banana Slug News is the only television news source on the UC Santa Cruz campus.

Format

Three times a quarter news team members film, write, edit, and produce segments on news pertaining to the campus and surrounding communities.

Anchored through the use of a virtual set, current events are intercut with prerecorded news pieces ranging from voice-over recaps of events to full-length investigative news reports.

Features

The main core of the program features news developments from the two weeks between production nights.

There are two reoccurring features:

SlugCenter -  an anchored segment that delivers UCSC sports highlights and upcoming home and away events.

Global News - A prerecorded segment where news from around the world is reported on.

Lead Staff

Banana Slug News
 Executive Producer - Timothy Tsung (2016–Present) Kathy Damian (2017-Present)
 News Producer - Kathia Damian (2016–Present)
 Treasurer/Outreach Coordinator - Jennifer Zepeda (2016–Present)
 Sports Producer - Jocelyne Medina (2016–Present)

Previous Executive Producers
 Frank Nunez (2005-2007)
 Kailey Offerman (2007-2008)
 Noah Chamow (2008-2010)
 Ryan Anderson (2010–2011)
 Pierce Crosby (2010–2011)
 Ruby Tarzian (2012-2013)
 Pauline Ditsch & Alex Owens (2013–2014)
 Aron Garst (2014-2015)
 Annaamalaii Palani (2015-2016)

University of California, Santa Cruz
Student television